Leiby is a surname. Notable people with the surname include:

Jeanne M. Leiby (1964–2011), American teacher, writer and literary magazine editor
Larry Leiby (born 1947), American attorney and arbitrator

See also
Jacob Leiby Farm was listed on the National Register of Historic Places in 1992
Murder of Leiby Kletzky